Bowland Bridge is a village in Cumbria, England.

See also

External links

Villages in Cumbria
South Lakeland District